Kanavis may refer to:
Kanavis McGhee (b. 1968), American football player
Kanavis, Iran, a village in Razavi Khorasan Province